La Zubia is a municipality located in the province of Granada, Spain. According to the 2010 census (INE), the city has a population of 18,240 inhabitants.

Twin towns — sister cities

La Zubia is twinned with:
 Miercurea Ciuc, Romania

References

Municipalities in the Province of Granada